The Heart's Content Formation is a formation of dark grey/black shales and mudstones, with occasional silts and sands, cropping out in Newfoundland.

References

Ediacaran Newfoundland and Labrador